The 7th Golden Satellite Awards, honoring the best in film and television of 2002, were presented by the International Press Academy on January 12, 2003.

Special achievement awards
Mary Pickford Award (for outstanding contribution to the entertainment industry) – Robert Evans

Nikola Tesla Award (for a lifetime of visionary filmmaking achievement) – George Lucas

Outstanding New Talent – Derek Luke

Outstanding Service in the Entertainment Industry – Murray Weissman and Dick Delson (Weissman Delson Communications)

Motion picture winners and nominees

Best Actor – Drama
 Michael Caine – The Quiet American (TIE) 
 Daniel Day-Lewis – Gangs of New York (TIE)
Tom Hanks – Road to Perdition
Jack Nicholson – About Schmidt
Edward Norton – 25th Hour
Robin Williams – One Hour Photo

Best Actor – Musical or Comedy
 Kieran Culkin – Igby Goes Down
Nicolas Cage – Adaptation.
Hugh Grant – About a Boy
Sam Rockwell – Confessions of a Dangerous Mind
Adam Sandler – Punch-Drunk Love
Aaron Stanford – Tadpole

Best Actress – Drama
 Diane Lane – Unfaithful
Salma Hayek – Frida
Nicole Kidman – The Hours
Julianne Moore – Far from Heaven
Meryl Streep – The Hours
Sigourney Weaver – The Guys

Best Actress – Musical or Comedy
 Jennifer Westfeldt – Kissing Jessica Stein
Jennifer Aniston – The Good Girl
Maggie Gyllenhaal – Secretary
Catherine Keener – Lovely & Amazing
Nia Vardalos – My Big Fat Greek Wedding
Renée Zellweger – Chicago

Best Animated or Mixed Media Film
 Spirited Away (Sen to Chihiro no kamikakushi)
Ice Age
Lilo & Stitch
Spirit: Stallion of the Cimarron
The Wild Thornberrys Movie

Best Art Direction
 Gangs of New York – Dante Ferretti
Catch Me If You Can
CQ
Frida
Road to Perdition

Best Cinematography
 Road to Perdition – Conrad L. Hall
Far from Heaven
Gangs of New York
The Lord of the Rings: The Two Towers
Minority Report

Best Costume Design
 Frida – Julie Weiss
Austin Powers in Goldmember
Gangs of New York
Road to Perdition
Star Wars: Episode II – Attack of the Clones

Best Director
 Todd Haynes – Far from Heaven
Pedro Almodóvar – Talk to Her (Hable con ella)
Stephen Daldry – The Hours
Peter Jackson – The Lord of the Rings: The Two Towers
Phillip Noyce – The Quiet American
Denzel Washington – Antwone Fisher

Best Documentary Film
 The Kid Stays in the Picture
Biggie and Tupac
Bowling for Columbine
The Cockettes
Dogtown and Z-Boys

Best Editing
 Gangs of New York – Thelma Schoonmaker
Adaptation.
Insomnia
The Lord of the Rings: The Two Towers
One Hour Photo

Best Film – Drama
 Far from Heaven
Antwone Fisher
The Hours
The Lord of the Rings: The Two Towers
The Quiet American
Road to Perdition

Best Film – Musical or Comedy
 My Big Fat Greek Wedding
About a Boy
Adaptation.
Igby Goes Down
Punch-Drunk Love

Best Foreign Language Film
 Talk to Her (Hable con ella), Spain
All or Nothing, UK
Bloody Sunday, Ireland/UK
Everyone Loves Alice (Alla älskar Alice), Sweden
Monsoon Wedding, India
Rain, New Zealand
Sex and Lucia (Lucía y el sexo), France/Spain

Best Original Score
 "Frida" – Elliot Goldenthal
"24 Hour Party People" – Liz Gallacher
"25th Hour" – Terence Blanchard
"About a Boy" – Damon Gough
"Roger Dodger" – Craig Wedren

Best Original Song
 "Something to Talk About" performed by Badly Drawn Boy – About a Boy
"8 Mile" – 8 Mile
"Die Another Day" – Die Another Day
"Girl on the Roof" – Van Wilder
"Love Is a Crime" – Chicago
"Work It Out" – Austin Powers in Goldmember

Best Screenplay – Adapted
 Adaptation. – Charlie and Donald Kaufman
Chicago – Bill Condon
The Lord of the Rings: The Two Towers – Philippa Boyens, Peter Jackson, Stephen Sinclair and Fran Walsh
My Big Fat Greek Wedding – Nia Vardalos
The Pianist – Ronald Harwood

Best Screenplay – Original
 Talk to Her (Hable con ella) – Pedro Almodóvar
All or Nothing – Mike Leigh
Far from Heaven – Todd Haynes
The Good Girl – Mike White
Igby Goes Down – Burr Steers
Lovely & Amazing – Nicole Holofcener

Best Sound
 Solaris – Larry Blake
Gangs of New York
The Lord of the Rings: The Two Towers
Minority Report
Signs

Best Supporting Actor – Drama
 Dennis Haysbert – Far from Heaven
Jeremy Davies – Solaris
Alfred Molina – Frida
Viggo Mortensen – The Lord of the Rings: The Two Towers
Paul Newman – Road to Perdition
Dennis Quaid – Far from Heaven

Best Supporting Actor – Musical or Comedy
 Michael Constantine – My Big Fat Greek Wedding
Chris Cooper – Adaptation.
Jake Gyllenhaal – The Good Girl
Philip Seymour Hoffman – Punch-Drunk Love
Nicky Katt – Full Frontal
John C. Reilly – The Good Girl

Best Supporting Actress – Drama
 Edie Falco – Sunshine State
Kathy Bates – About Schmidt
Julianne Moore – The Hours
Miranda Richardson – Spider
Do Thi Hai Yen – The Quiet American
Renée Zellweger – White Oleander

Best Supporting Actress – Musical or Comedy
 Tovah Feldshuh – Kissing Jessica Stein
Toni Collette – About a Boy
Lainie Kazan – My Big Fat Greek Wedding
Emily Mortimer – Lovely & Amazing
Bebe Neuwirth – Tadpole
Meryl Streep – Adaptation.

Best Visual Effects
 The Lord of the Rings: The Two Towers
Gangs of New York
Minority Report
Road to Perdition
Spider-Man

Outstanding Motion Picture Ensemble
The Lord of the Rings: The Two Towers

Television winners and nominees

Best Actor – Drama Series
 Kiefer Sutherland – 24
Michael Chiklis – The Shield
Peter Krause – Six Feet Under
Chi McBride – Boston Public
Martin Sheen – The West Wing

Best Actor – Musical or Comedy Series
 Bernie Mac – The Bernie Mac Show
Matt LeBlanc – Friends
Eric McCormack – Will & Grace
John C. McGinley – Scrubs
Damon Wayans – My Wife and Kids

Best Actor – Miniseries or TV Film
 William H. Macy – Door to Door
Ted Danson – Living with the Dead
Albert Finney – The Gathering Storm
Harry Lennix – Keep the Faith, Baby
Patrick Stewart – King of Texas

Best Actress – Drama Series
 CCH Pounder – The Shield
Jennifer Garner – Alias
Sarah Michelle Gellar – Buffy the Vampire Slayer
Allison Janney – The West Wing
Maura Tierney – ER

Best Actress – Musical or Comedy Series
 Debra Messing – Will & Grace
Jennifer Aniston – Friends
Alexis Bledel – Gilmore Girls
Lauren Graham – Gilmore Girls
Bonnie Hunt – Life with Bonnie

Best Actress – Miniseries or TV Film
 Vanessa Williams – Keep the Faith, Baby
Kathy Bates – My Sister's Keeper
Stockard Channing – The Matthew Shepard Story
Marcia Gay Harden – King of Texas
Vanessa Redgrave – The Gathering Storm

Best Miniseries
 Taken
The Forsyte Saga
Master Spy: The Robert Hanssen Story
Living with the Dead
Shackleton

Best Series – Drama
 CSI: Crime Scene Investigation
24
Alias
Buffy the Vampire Slayer
Without a Trace

Best Series – Musical or Comedy
 The Bernie Mac Show
Curb Your Enthusiasm
Friends
Gilmore Girls
Scrubs

Best TV Film
 Door to Door
The Gathering Storm
Keep the Faith, Baby
The Laramie Project
Path to War

Best Supporting Actor – Drama Series
 Victor Garber – Alias
Dennis Haysbert – 24
Anthony Heald – Boston Public
James Marsters – Buffy the Vampire Slayer
Ron Rifkin – Alias

Best Supporting Actor – Musical or Comedy Series
 Eric Roberts – Less Than Perfect
Sean Hayes – Will & Grace
Peter MacNicol – Ally McBeal
Chris Noth – Sex and the City
David Hyde Pierce – Frasier

Best Supporting Actor – Miniseries or TV Film
 Linus Roache – The Gathering Storm
Jim Broadbent – The Gathering Storm
Jeremy Davies – The Laramie Project
Terry Kinney – The Laramie Project
Roy Scheider – King of Texas

Best Supporting Actress – Drama Series
 Sarah Clarke – 24
Emma Caulfield – Buffy the Vampire Slayer
Loretta Devine – Boston Public
Alyson Hannigan – Buffy the Vampire Slayer
Lena Olin – Alias

Best Supporting Actress – Musical or Comedy Series
 Doris Roberts – Everybody Loves Raymond
Kelly Bishop – Gilmore Girls
Christa Miller – Scrubs
Megan Mullally – Will & Grace
Cynthia Nixon – Sex and the City

Best Supporting Actress – Miniseries or TV Film
 Helen Mirren – Door to Door
Queen Latifah – Living with the Dead
Amy Madigan – Just a Dream
Sissy Spacek – Last Call
Frances Sternhagen – The Laramie Project

New Media winners and nominees

Best DVD Extras
Minority Report (For the documentary)
The Last Waltz (For the commentary)
The Lord of the Rings: The Fellowship of the Ring (For the commentary)
The Producers (For the documentary)
Singin' in the Rain (For the commentary)

Most Innovative Story Design
Eternal Darkness: Sanity's Requiem
Grand Theft Auto: Vice City
Medal of Honor: Frontline
Metal Gear Solid 2: Substance
Warcraft III: Reign of Chaos

Outstanding Art Direction
Biohazard Ø
Grand Theft Auto: Vice City
Jet Set Radio Future
Pro Surfer
Mafia: The City of Lost Heaven

Outstanding Character
Shinobi (for "Shinobi")
Maximo: Ghosts to Glory (for "Maximo")
Ratchet & Clank (for "Ratchet")
Sly Cooper and the Thievius Raccoonus (for "Sly Cooper")
Spider-Man (for "Spiderman")

Outstanding Execution of a Gaming Concept
No One Lives Forever 2: A Spy in H.A.R.M.'s Way
Eternal Darkness: Sanity's Requiem
Mafia: The City of Lost Heaven
Metroid Prime
The Sims Online

Outstanding Overall DVD
The Lord of the Rings: The Fellowship of the Ring
Buffy the Vampire Slayer (For Season 2.)
Austin Powers in Goldmember
A Hard Day's Night
Minority Report
Monterey Pop
Y Tu Mamá También

Outstanding Youth DVD
Monsters, Inc.
Beauty and the Beast
Ice Age
Jimmy Neutron: Boy Genius
Singin' in the Rain

Special Humanitarian DVD
9/11 (Jules Naudet, Gédéon Naudet, and James Hanlon)

Awards breakdown

Film
Winners:
3 / 7 Far from Heaven: Best Director / Best Film – Drama / Best Supporting Actor – Drama
2 / 2 Kissing Jessica Stein: Best Actress – Musical or Comedy / Best Supporting Actress – Musical or Comedy
2 / 3 Talk to Her (Hable con ella): Best Foreign Language Film / Best Screenplay – Original
2 / 5 My Big Fat Greek Wedding: Best Film & Supporting Actor – Musical or Comedy
2 / 5 Frida: Best Costume Design / Best Original Score
2 / 7 Gangs of New York: Best Actor – Drama / Best Art Direction / Best Editing
2 / 8 The Lord of the Rings: The Two Towers: Best Visual Effects / Outstanding Motion Picture Ensemble
1 / 1 The Kid Stays in the Picture: Best Documentary Film
1 / 1 Spirited Away (Sen to Chihiro no kamikakushi): Best Animated or Mixed Media Film
1 / 1 Sunshine State: Best Supporting Actress – Drama
1 / 1 Unfaithful: Best Actress – Drama
1 / 2 Solaris: Best Sound
1 / 3 Igby Goes Down: Best Actor – Musical or Comedy
1 / 4 The Quiet American: Best Actor – Drama
1 / 5 About a Boy: Best Original Song
1 / 6 Adaptation.: Best Screenplay – Adapted
1 / 7 Road to Perdition: Best Cinematography

Losers:
0 / 5 The Hours
0 / 4 The Good Girl
0 / 3 Austin Powers in Goldmember, Chicago, Lovely & Amazing, Punch-Drunk Love
0 / 2 25th Hour, About Schmidt, Antwone Fisher, Ice Age, One Hour Photo, Tadpole

Television
Winners:
3 / 3 Door to Door: Best Actor – Miniseries or TV Film / Best Supporting Actress – Miniseries or TV Film / Best TV Film
2 / 2 The Bernie Mac Show: Best Actor – Musical or Comedy Series / Best Series – Musical or Comedy Series
2 / 3 24: Best Actor – Drama Series / Best Supporting Actress – Drama Series
1 / 1 CSI: Crime Scene Investigation: Best Series – Drama
1 / 1 Everybody Loves Raymond: Best Supporting Actress – Musical or Comedy Series
1 / 1 Less Than Perfect: Best Supporting Actor – Musical or Comedy Series
1 / 1 Taken: Best Miniseries
1 / 2 The Shield: Best Actress – Drama Series
1 / 3 Keep the Faith, Baby: Best Actress – Miniseries or TV Film
1 / 4 Will & Grace: Best Actress – Musical or Comedy Series
1 / 5 Alias: Best Supporting Actor – Drama Series
1 / 5 The Gathering Storm: Best Supporting Actor – Miniseries or TV Film

Losers:
0 / 5 Buffy the Vampire Slayer
0 / 4 Gilmore Girls, The Laramie Project
0 / 3 Boston Public, Friends, King of Texas, Living with the Dead, Scrubs
0 / 2 Sex and the City, The West Wing

References

Satellite Awards ceremonies
2002 awards
2002 film awards
2002 television awards